Miss Universe Australia 2021 was the 17th edition of the Miss Universe Australia pageant held on October 19, 2021 at Sofitel Melbourne on Collins, Melbourne, Victoria. Maria Thattil of Victoria crowned her successor Daria Varlamova of Victoria at the end of the event. Varlamova represented Australia at Miss Universe 2021, but was unplaced.

Results

Special awards

Delegates
The delegates were as follows:

References

External links
Official Website

2021
2020s in Melbourne
2021 beauty pageants
2021 in Australia